Rondell may refer to:

People

Rondell Bartholomew (born 1990), Grenadian 400 metre runner
Ron'Dell Carter (born 1997), American football player

Surname
Cregg Rondell - vocalist in Boy Hits Car 
R. A. Rondell Stuntman, actor and assistant director (brother of Reid Rondell)
Reid Rondell, Stuntman and actor, who died due to helicopter explosion during filming of "Airwolf" TV series.

Places
Rondell the first name for Mehringplatz, Berlin

Music
The Rondells, redirects to Delbert McClinton
The Rondelles, are an indiepop band originally from Albuquerque, New Mexico.
Rondell (Pole single), a single by the musician Pole (musician)

See also
Rundell fictional friend of the fictional character Charles Gunn who appears in Belonging (Angel episode)
Rondel (disambiguation)